"Hands Up" a song by American girl group TLC. It was written and produced by both Babyface and Daryl Simmons for the band's fourth studio album, 3D (2002), and released as the album's second single following "Girl Talk" in the United States in November 2002. The sensual mid-tempo song became the band's first single release to neither enter the US Billboard Hot 100 nor the Hot R&B/Hip-Hop Singles & Tracks chart. It, however, reached number 18 on the Billboard Hot Singles Sales chart. The song was not included on any of the group's official greatest hits albums. Remixes for the track were used as the B-side to follow-up single "Damaged" in European countries.

Released to positive reviews, "Hands Up" garnered TLC a nomination at the 2004 Grammy Awards for Best R&B Performance by a Duo or Group with Vocal. An accompanying music video, directed by Matthew Rolston, features a cameo appearance by Countess Vaughn. A remix featuring Jermaine Dupri and the Kid Slim was recorded, containing interpolations of "Nasty Boy" by the Notorious B.I.G.

Music video
The video was shot on January 10, 2003. TLC is reunited with Matthew Rolston, director of their videos for "Creep" and "Red Light Special", for the music video of the song. In it, band members T-Boz and Chilli are at a futuristic strip club where several of the male strippers have tattoos of UPCs and they are scanning them. A behind-the-scenes footage was shown on BET's Access Granted.

The video was released as a DVD single along with the video for "Girl Talk".

Track listing

Notes
  denotes additional producer
  denotes additional co-producer

Sample credits
"Hands Up" (So So Def Remix)" contains portions from "Nasty Boy" as performed by the Notorious B.I.G.

Credits and personnel 
Credits adapted from the liner notes of 3D.

 Babyface – writer, producer, all keyboards, drum programming, electric and acoustic guitars
 Paul Boutin – recording
 Serban Ghenea – mixing
 John Hanes – Pro Tools engineer
 Tavia Ivey – background vocals
 Debra Killings – background vocals
 Tim Roberts – assistant mix engineer
 Daryl Simmons – producer, writer
 Ivy Skoff – production coordinator
 Craig Taylor – assistant engineer
 Rozonda "Chilli" Thomas – vocals
 Tionne "T-Boz" Watkins – vocals

Charts

References

2002 singles
2002 songs
Arista Records singles
Music videos directed by Matthew Rolston
TLC (group) songs
Song recordings produced by Babyface (musician)
Song recordings produced by Daryl Simmons
Songs written by Babyface (musician)
Songs written by Daryl Simmons